Oskar Ernfrid Bogstedt (January 8, 1908 – August 17, 1989) was a Swedish artist. Bogstedt had exhibits together with Beppe Wolgers.
He was related to the musician Stefan Bogstedt.

References 

1908 births
1989 deaths
20th-century Swedish artists
Swedish male artists
20th-century Swedish male artists